Wang Su-jin (born 4 September 1973) is a South Korean former basketball player who competed in the 2000 Summer Olympics.

References

1973 births
Living people
South Korean women's basketball players
Olympic basketball players of South Korea
Basketball players at the 2000 Summer Olympics